Kevin Magee may refer to:

Kevin Magee (motorcyclist) (born 1962), former Grand Prix motorcycle road racer
Kevin Magee (basketball) (1959–2003), American basketball player
Kevin Magee (executive), American television executive

See also
Kevin McGee, American politician